Zbogom, Srbijo (Serbian Cyrillic: Збогом, Србијо, trans. Farewell, Serbia) is the twelfth studio album from Serbian and former Yugoslav rock band Riblja Čorba, released in 1993.

Zbogom, Srbijo is the last album recorded with guitarist Zoran Ilić. Although Vlada Barjaktarević played the keyboards (and co-produced the album) he would become the official member of the band after the release of the band's following studio album, Ostalo je ćutanje. The song "Kamenko i Kremenko" featured Kristijan Golubović on vocals.

The album's biggest hits were the ballad "Jedino moje" and the anti-war song "Zbogom, Srbijo". The album also featured "Zelena trava doma mog" (a cover of "Green Green Grass of Home"), "Danas nema mleka" (a heavy metal cover of Herman's Hermits' "No Milk Today"), which criticizes the Socialist Party of Serbia regime, and "Tamna je noć" (a cover of Mark Bernes' "Tyomnaya noch").

Album cover
The album cover, designed by Jugoslav Vlahović, is a parody of the double-headed eagle which appears on the coat of arms of Serbia, but there is also a connection with the cover of Riblja Čorba's 1981 album Mrtva priroda.

Track listing

Personnel
Bora Đorđević – vocals
Vidoja Božinović – guitar
Zoran Ilić – guitar
Miša Aleksić – bass guitar
Vicko Milatović – drums

Additional personnel
Vlada Barjaktarević – keyboardsm co-producer
Marija Mihajlović – backing vocals
Aleksandar Radivojević – harmonica
Kristijan Golubović – vocals (on "Kamenko i Kremenko")

References

Zbogom, Srbijo at Discogs
 EX YU ROCK enciklopedija 1960-2006,  Janjatović Petar;  
 Riblja čorba,  Jakovljević Mirko;

External links
Zbogom, Srbijo at Discogs

Riblja Čorba albums
1993 albums